Carina is a female given name. Notable persons with that name include: 
Carina Adolfsson Elgestam (born 1959, Swedish politician
Carina Afable (born 1944), Filipino actress and singer
 Carina Aulenbrock (born 1994), German  volleyball player
 Carina Axelsson (born 1968), American author
 Carina Bär (born 1990), German rower
 Carina Beduschi (born 1984), Brazilian actress, television host, architect, and model
 Carina Benninga (born 1962), Dutch field hockey player
 Carina Berg (born 1977), Swedish comedian and television presenter
 Carina Burman (born 1960) is a Swedish novelist and literature scholar
 Carina Caicedo (born 1987), Ecuadorian  footballer
 Carina Christensen (born 1972), Danish politician
 Carina Cruz (born 1983), Colombian actress, model and designer
 Carina Rosenvinge Christiansen (born 1991), Danish archer
 Carina Dahl (born 1985), Norwegian singer and songwriter
 Carina Diamond (born 1962), American financial advisor
 Carina Adolfsson Elgestam (born 1959), Swedish politician
 Carina Hägg (born 1957), Swedish politician
 Carina Herrstedt (born 1971), Swedish politician
 Carina Holmberg (born 1983), Swedish football player
 Carina Horn (born 1989), South African sprinter
 Carina Görlin (born 1963), Swedish cross country skier
 Carina Jaarnek (1962–2016), Swedish singer
 Carina Johansson, Swedish musician
 Carina Kirssi Ketonen (born 1976), Finnish racing cyclist
 Carina Lau (born 1965), Chinese actress
 Carina Lemoine (born 1969), Dutch singer
 Carina Lidbom (born 1957), Swedish actress and comedian
 Carina Ljungdahl (born 1960), Swedish freestyle swimmer
 Carina Lorenzo (born 1994), Dominican handball player
 Carina Moberg (1966–2012), Swedish politician
 Carina E. Nilsson, Swedish pianist
 Carina Ohlsson (born 1957), Swedish  politician
 Carina Persson (born 1958), Swedish model
 Carina Raich (born 1979), Austrian alpine skier 
 Carina Ricco (born 1969), Mexican actress, singer, musician, producer and composer
 Carina Round (born 1979), British singer-songwriter
 Carina Rozenfeld (born 1972), French author
 Carina Rydberg (born 1962), Swedish writer
 Carina Strobel (born 1997), German ice hockey player
 Carina Wenninger (born 1991), Austrian football player
 Carina Wiese (born 1970), German actress
 Carina Witthöft (born 1995), German tennis player
 Carina Vance Mafla (born 1977), American politician
 Carina Vitulano (born 1975), Italian football referee
 Carina Vogt (born 1992), German ski jumper
Carina Van Cauter (born 1962), Belgian politician
 Carina van Zyl (born 1975), South African field hockey player 
 Carina Zampini (born 1975), Argentine actress

See also

Carlina (name)
 Karina (name)
 Cara (given name)
 Carine (given name)

English feminine given names
French feminine given names
German feminine given names
Swedish feminine given names
Norwegian feminine given names
Danish feminine given names
Spanish feminine given names
Feminine given names